Mark Robert Speight, known professionally as Mark Stanley, is an English actor. He is best known for his roles in Game of Thrones, Dickensian, and as Rob Hepworth in the third series of BBC drama Happy Valley.

Early life and education
Mark Robert Speight was born in Leeds. He attended Allerton High School and Prince Henry's Grammar School, Otley, where he began acting. He graduated from the Guildhall School of Music and Drama in 2010.

Filmography

Film

Television

References

External links

Living people
1988 births
21st-century English male actors
Alumni of the Guildhall School of Music and Drama
English male film actors
English male stage actors
English male television actors
Male actors from Leeds
People educated at Prince Henry's Grammar School, Otley